Lemdadella is an extinct genus of redlichiid trilobites that lived during the late Atdabanian stage, which lasted from 521 to 514 million years ago during the early part of the Cambrian Period.

Distribution 
  Lemdadella sp. occurs in the Lower Cambrian of Morocco (Botomian, Ounein A bioherm, Lemdad 1 section, High Atlas)
  Lemdadella linaresae was collected in the Lower Cambrian of Spain (Atdabanian, Pedroche Formation, Member 1, Puente de Hierro Section)
  Lemdadella sp. was found in the Lower Cambrian of Antarctica (Toyonian, Shackleton Limestone; BC-BD collections)
  Lemdadella antarcticae occurs in the Lower Cambrian of Antarctica (Atdabanian, Shackleton Limestone; BC-BD collections)

Description 
Glabella gently tapered forward. At the midline, a ridge between the glabella and the border of the cephalon (a so-called plectrum) may be present. Crescent-shaped eye-ridges. Thorax not divided in prothorax and opisthothorax, no macropleural segment.

Biostratigraphy 
Lemdadella is currently the oldest trilobite genus known, dating back to about  million years ago. 
The International Commission on Stratigraphy has proposed that the first appearance datum of trilobites should be used as the lower boundary of Cambrian Series 2 and Cambrian Stage 3. If this proposal will be defined as a GSSP, it will most likely use the first appearance of Lemdadella, a species of Lemdadella, or a trilobite zone that includes Lemdadella. The age and global distribution of Lemdadella are therefore of key importance for the Stratigraphy of the Cambrian.

The following trilobite zones contain Lemdadella (Brackets contain geographic distribution):
 Fallotaspis zone (Spain, Laurentia)
 Eoredlichia-Yunnanocephalus zone (Antarctica)

References 

Redlichiidae
Cambrian trilobites
Fossils of Antarctica
Fossils of Spain
Redlichiida genera